Park Hill Golf Club is an 18-hole golf course located in Denver, Colorado. The Clark Hamilton designed course was established in 1931.

The Park Hill Golf Club had been the Clayton College Dairy Farm near the original site of the Lowry Airport.

References

Golf clubs and courses in Colorado